The International Film Music Critics Association Award for Breakthrough Composer of the Year is an annual award given by the International Film Music Critics Association, or the IFMCA. The award is given to new and/or emerging composers whose body of work in a given year is deemed to be the best in a given year. The award was first given in 1998. It has been awards every year since 2007.

Winners and nominations

1990s

2000s

2010s

2020s

References

International Film Music Critics Association Awards